Paul Hüttel (born 13 July 1935) is a Danish actor. He has appeared in over 50 films and television shows since 1960. He starred in the 1969 film Ballad of Carl-Henning, which was entered into the 19th Berlin International Film Festival. Hüttel is married to Danish actress Birthe Neumann; they have one daughter.

Selected filmography
 Ballad of Carl-Henning (1969)
 The Olsen Gang in a Fix (1969)
 Amour (1970)
 19 Red Roses (1974)
 Katinka (1988)
 Dance of the Polar Bears (1990)

References

External links

1935 births
Living people
Danish male film actors
People from Hedensted Municipality